The Association of British Scrabble Players oversees competitive Scrabble in the UK. It was formed in 1987 by agreement with J W Spear & Sons, the game's trademark owner, who were subsequently bought out by Mattel in 1993. It currently has around 600 members.

The ABSP controls a rating system containing the names of over 2,000 people who have played in Scrabble tournaments around the country. The Association also maintains a calendar of these events, handles publicity for them and many other Scrabble-related events and actively pursues sponsorship and the development of tournament Scrabble in the UK.

The honorary president of the Association is former Member of Parliament Gyles Brandreth, who founded the first British National Scrabble Championship in 1971 and has taken a keen interest in the game ever since. Former ABSP Chairman Allan Simmons is a prolific Scrabble author and the ABSP website was formerly maintained by Countdown series champion Stewart Holden, who previously held the post of publicity officer for the association.

The current ABSP chairperson is Mike Whiteoak.

References

External links
Official website
ABSP ratings
ABSP calendar

Scrabble in the United Kingdom
Scrabble organizations
Clubs and societies in the United Kingdom
1987 establishments in the United Kingdom
Organizations established in 1987